Joycelyn O'Brien is an American actress who has appeared in American theater, film and television. She has appeared in several made-for-television movies, as well as episodes of television series such as Star Trek, Quantum Leap, The Nut House, and New Adam-12. She also played a maid in the movie Oscar (1991) and Gina in the movie The Mambo Kings (1992). She has acted in over a dozen plays, including Biloxi Blues and Brighton Beach Memoirs.

Biography 
O'Brien is from Chicago, Illinois. She attended Northwestern University for drama, and spent a year at Royal Academy of Dramatic Art in London.

Theater 
She has been in several plays, including a role on Broadway in Biloxi Blues by Neil Simon, and the prequel Brighton Beach Memoirs.

Film and Television 
O'Brien appeared in The Nut House episode 21 Men and a Baby (1989), the Star Trek episode Allegiance (1990), the Quantum Leap episode Dreams (1991), and the New Adam-12 episode Families (1991).

She has appeared in eight television movies, including  1990 TV film Rock Hudson, When Time Expires (1997), Indictment: The McMartin Trial (1995), and Roseanne: An Unauthorized Biography (1994).

Her first movie role was as the housemaid of a Mafia don, played by Sylvester Stallone, in the movie Oscar (1991). She also appeared in The Mambo Kings (1992) as Gina.

References 

American stage actresses
American film actresses
American television actresses
Actresses from Chicago